

Events 
John Bull is appointed organist at Hereford Cathedral

Publications
Lodovico Agostini – Third book of madrigals, for six voices (Ferrara: Francesco Rossi & Paolo Tottorino)
Blasius Amon – Liber sacratissimarum (quas vulgo introitus appellant) cantionum selectissimus (Vienna: Stephan Creuzer)
Vittorio Baldini (ed.) – Il lauro secco (anthology of madrigals)
Paolo Bellasio – Second book of madrigals for five voices (Venice: heirs of Girolamo Scotto)
Antoine de Bertrand –  for four and five voices (Paris: Le Roy & Ballard), contains hymns and canticles
Jacobus de Kerle – 4 Masses for four and five voices (Antwerp: Christophe Plantin)
Paschal de l'Estocart
 for two, three, four, five, and six voices (Lyon: Barthelemi Vincent), settings of poems by Guy Du Faur, Seigneur de Pibrac
Francisco Guerrero – Second book of masses (Rome: Domenico Basa)
Paolo Isnardi – Magnificats for four, five, and six voices (Venice: heirs of Girolamo Scotto)
Orlande de Lassus
 for five voices (Munich: Adam Berg)
Motets for six voices (Munich: Adam Berg)
 for four voices (Munich: Adam Berg), a collection of readings from the Book of Job
 for four voices (Munich: Adam Berg), a collection of his chansons with new German texts
Carolus Luython – First book of madrigals for five voices (Venice: Angelo Gardano)
Luzzasco Luzzaschi – Third book of madrigals for five voices (Venice: Angelo Gardano)
Luca Marenzio – Third book of madrigals for five voices (Venice: Angelo Gardano)
Philippe de Monte – First book of madrigals for three voices (Venice: Angelo Gardano)
Claudio Monteverdi –  (Little Sacred Songs) for three voices (Venice: Angelo Gardan)
Pomponio Nenna – First book of madrigals for five voices (Venice: Angelo Gardano)
Giovanni Pierluigi da Palestrina – Fourth book of masses (Venice: Angelo Gardano)
Piae Cantiones (collection of late medieval Latin songs)

Classical music

Musical theatre

Births 
May 1 – Marco da Gagliano, composer (d. 1643)
June 26 – Johannes Schultz, composer (d. 1653)
December 23 – Severo Bonini, organist, composer and music writer (d. 1663)
date unknown
Gregorio Allegri, Italian composer (d. 1652)
Sigismondo d'India, Italian composer (d. 1629)

Deaths 
March – Severin Cornet, Franco-Flemish singer, conductor and composer (born c.1530)
May 3 or 4 – Giorgio Mainerio, Italian composer (born 1530/40)
July 14 – Johannes de Cleve, composer at the court of Ferdinand I and Charles II (born c.1529)
date unknown 
Leonora Sanvitale, Italian courtier and singer (born c.1558)
Pere Alberch Vila, organist and composer (born 1517)

 
Music
16th century in music
Music by year